The 1st Light Mechanized Division was a French Army formation during World War II. It was the first of the armoured divisions of the French Cavalry.

Formation
Preparations to create such a unit began in 1931. Slowly the 4th Cavalry Division was mechanised.

Name
In July 1935, the mechanised components, though still not fully equipped, were given a separate identity, while confusingly 4th Cavalry continued to exist, giving the false impression the armoured division was a completely new force. The name of the unit is most often translated as "Light Mechanized Division", but a better translation, both from a linguistic as military point of view, would be "Mechanized Light Division". In French the adjective mécanique qualifies légère, not the other way around. In French military parlance, light troops were those that engaged in scouting and skirmishing, and the distinction traditionally applied to both cavalry and infantry arms.  A mechanized light division was therefore one designed for this role but using modern motorized and armored equipment to perform it.  Some motorised infantry divisions without tracked vehicles would also be called "light divisions".

Organisation
Another confusion often caused by the category indication is the mistake to assume that such units were "lightly" equipped: in fact most heavy equipment was concentrated into the motorised units which represented the most powerful in the French Army. The 1re DLM used the AMR 35 as a light skirmisher and the Somua S-35 and Hotchkiss H35 as main battle tanks, though the latter vehicle was not really suited for this role as its armament was too weak. The artillery and infantry components were fully motorised; part of the organic infantry was also mechanised, using half-tracks. In organisation a DLM closely resembled the contemporaneous German Panzerdivision of the Panzerwaffe, though it would be more "tank-heavy", not so much the Leichte Kavalleriedivisionen of the German Cavalry, which units in the thirties were only partly mechanised.

World War II

Battle Of France
During the Battle of France in May 1940 the division contained the following units:

1st Light Mechanized Armoured Brigade
4th Cuirassier Armoured Regiment
18th Dragoon Armoured Regiment
2nd Light Mechanized Infantry Brigade
4th Mechanized Dragoon Regiment
6th Cuirassier Cavalry Reconnaissance Regiment
74th Mechanized Artillery Regiment

References

Light Mechanized Division, 1st